"I'm Gonna Miss Her (The Fishin' Song)" is a song co-written and recorded by American country music artist Brad Paisley. It was released in February 2002 as the third single from his album Part II.  The song reached the top of the Billboard Hot Country Songs chart (then known as the Hot Country Singles & Tracks chart) that year, becoming the third number-one hit of Paisley's career.  Paisley wrote this song with Frank Rogers, who also produced it.

Writing and inspiration
While still a student at Belmont University in Nashville, Tennessee in the early 1990s, Paisley had been asked to participate in a student concert. Having primarily sung ballads at that point in his career, he decided to add a novelty song to his repertoire. Frank Rogers, a fellow student who would eventually become Paisley's record producer, agreed, suggesting that they should "write something that will make them laugh", and the two then began to write the song. Their collaboration resulted in "I'm Gonna Miss Her (The Fishin' Song)", a moderate up-tempo, centralizing on a male character whose lover has threatened to leave him if he goes fishing instead of staying home with her. Having chosen to go fishing instead, the character then states that he will "miss her when [he gets] home".

When Paisley performed the song at the student concert, he received a positive reaction from the audience members, who began to laugh and cheer once he reached the first chorus. After signing to his recording contract with Arista Nashville in 1999, Paisley planned to place the song on his debut album Who Needs Pictures. Although the label had wanted him to do so, Rogers thought that the "song was better for a more established artist".

Although Garth Brooks, George Strait, and Alan Jackson had all shown interest in recording the song, Paisley kept it to himself after the success of his Who Needs Pictures album. He then recorded "I'm Gonna Miss Her" for his Part II album, and the song was released as that album's third single, despite Paisley's initial reluctance, as he had thought that the concept of a male choosing fishing over love might be offensive to female listeners.

Critical reception
The song went on to reach the top of the Billboard country charts for 2 weeks in mid-2002, becoming Paisley's third Number One hit on the country charts. In addition, it received Song of the Year, Single of the Year, and Video of the Year nominations from the Country Music Association; in addition, its music video received the award for "Concept Video of the Year" at CMT's 2002 Flameworthy Awards.

TV personalities Dan Patrick and Jerry Springer and actress Kimberly Williams, whom Paisley was dating at the time and whom he later married, appear in the video.

Music video
The music video was directed by  Peter Zavadil and premiered on February 22, 2002 on CMT. The video starred country legend Little Jimmy Dickens, fishing legend Hank Parker, television presenter Jerry Springer, sports broadcaster Dan Patrick and Paisley's future wife Kimberly Williams.

Personnel
 Glen Duncan – fiddle
 Kevin "Swine" Grantt – bass guitar
 Bernie Herms – piano
 Wes Hightower – background vocals
 Mike Johnson – steel guitar, Dobro
 Mitch McMitchen – percussion
 Brad Paisley – lead vocals, electric guitar, acoustic guitar
 Ben Sesar – drums

Chart performance
"I'm Gonna Miss Her" spent twenty-five weeks on the Billboard Hot Country Singles & Tracks (now Hot Country Songs) charts, peaking at Number One on the chart dated for the week ending July 6, 2002 and holding that position for two weeks. It was the third Number One hit of Paisley's career. The song's B-side, "I Wish You'd Stay," was released as the album's next single late in the year.

Year-end charts

Certifications

References

2002 singles
2001 songs
Brad Paisley songs
Songs written by Brad Paisley
Songs written by Frank Rogers (record producer)
Music videos directed by Peter Zavadil
Song recordings produced by Frank Rogers (record producer)
Arista Nashville singles